Håvard Jorbekk Blikra (born November 2, 1991) is a Norwegian former road cyclist.

Major results

2012
 5th Poreč Trophy
 9th Rogaland GP
2014
 3rd Grand Prix Paul Borremans
 5th Destination Thy
 7th Hadeland GP
2015
 1st  Overall Boucle de l'Artois
1st Stages 1, 2 & 3
 2nd Skive–Løbet
 3rd Ster van Zwolle
 6th Himmerland Rundt
 8th Gooikse Pijl
2016
 4th Arno Wallaard Memorial
 5th GP Viborg
 6th Himmerland Rundt
 7th Grand Prix de la Ville de Lillers

References

External links

1991 births
Living people
Norwegian male cyclists